Fort Nelson, built in 1781 by troops under George Rogers Clark including Captain Richard Chenoweth, was the second on-shore fort on the Ohio River in the area of what is now downtown Louisville, Kentucky. Fort-on-Shore, the downriver and first on-shore fort, had proved to be insufficient barely three years after it was established. In response to continuing attacks from Native Americans and the threat of British attacks during the Revolutionary War, Fort Nelson was constructed between what is currently Main Street and the river, with its main gate near Seventh Street. It was named after Thomas Nelson, Jr., then the governor of Virginia. (Kentucky was part of Virginia at the time.)

The fort was used as a courthouse and jail until one was built.  The fort was garrisoned until the building of Fort Finney across the river at the site of what is today Jeffersonville, Indiana about 1784. In the fort's place today stands Fort Nelson Park, a shady plaza or 'pocket park' housing a granite monument commemorating the fort.

See also
 History of Louisville, Kentucky

References

Nelson
Former buildings and structures in Louisville, Kentucky
Nelson
History of Louisville, Kentucky
Parks in Louisville, Kentucky
Pre-statehood history of Kentucky
Kentucky in the American Revolution
Military installations established in 1781
1781 establishments in Virginia